Dumpy Creek is a rural locality in the Shire of Banana, Queensland, Australia. In the  Dumpy Creek had a population of 11 people.

History 
The locality is presumably named after the creek.

In the  Dumpy Creek had a population of 11 people.

Geography
The Dee River forms the south-eastern boundary.

Road infrastructure
The Leichhardt Highway runs through the south-east corner.

References 

Shire of Banana
Localities in Queensland